Wang Daohan, (27 March 1915 – 24 December 2005) was a Chinese politician who was president of the Association for Relations Across the Taiwan Straits (ARATS) from 1991 to 2005.

Biography
Wang was born in Jiashan County (present day Mingguang City) in China's Anhui province in 1915 and joined the Communist Party of China in 1938. During his early career within the government of the People's Republic of China, he focused on trade and investment issues.  In 1965 he was the deputy minister of the State Commission for Foreign Economic Relations with Foreign Countries and in 1979 he was appointed vice-chair of the State Foreign Investment Commission and vice-chair of the State Import-Export Commission. Later Wang came to greater prominence when, after a year as vice-mayor, he was appointed mayor of Shanghai in 1981.  As mayor, Wang contributed to the success of Deng Xiaoping's economic reforms by actively encouraging foreign investment and joint ventures. When he retired in 1985, Wang convinced the party authorities to name his protégé Jiang Zemin as his successor.

On 16 December 1991 Wang was named the president of Association for Relations Across the Taiwan Straits (ARATS), a semi-official organization created to correspond with the Taiwan-based Straits Exchange Foundation (SEF). The following year Wang and SEF chairman Koo Chen-fu held preliminary talks in Hong Kong which resulted in the so-called "1992 Consensus" and facilitated negotiations of practical matters. However, the content and the very existence of this "1992 Consensus" is still widely disputed. In April 1993, Koo and Wang met in Singapore to hold the Wang-Koo summit. A second round of talks followed in 1998, in Shanghai, but no further talks have taken place since. Beijing called off talks in 1999, after Republic of China President Lee Teng-hui proposed his two-states theory. Wang died in Shanghai on the morning of 24 December 2005.

References
"Economic Policy after the 16th Party Congress"
Same Bed, Different Dreams
AsiaWeek "Who's Who"

|-

1915 births
2005 deaths
Mayors of Shanghai
People from Mingguang
People's Republic of China politicians from Anhui
Chinese Communist Party politicians from Anhui
Politicians from Chuzhou
People of the Republic of China